Dr. Jernail Singh Anand is a poet. Dr Anand has authored 140 books of English Poetry, fiction, non-fiction and spirituality. He was awarded a Ph. D. in English by Panjab University Chandigarh  in year 2000. He is a environmentalist and a column writer. He retired as Principal and is now on an Honorary Position of Professor Emeritus at Institute of European Roma Studies and Research, Crimes Against Humanity and International Law, Belgrade, Serbia. Dr Anand has co-innovated the theory of Bio-Text in Critical Theory along with an Iranian Scholar, Dr Roghayeh Farsi, chief coordinator of a research project on the poetry of Dr Anand initiated by University of Neyshabur, Iran. He Was President of The World Poetry Conference Organized in October 2019 in Bathinda Punjab, India.

Early life and education
Born in 1955 at Ludhiana, Punjab and grew up at native village Longowal in the Sangrur, Punjab, Anand graduated from Govt. College, Ludhiana, and earned his Masters in English Literature from Punjabi University, Patiala. Punjab University, Chandigarh conferred on him degree of Doctor of Philosophy in 2000 for his work on mysticism in the poetry of Walt Whitman and Prof. Puran Singh.

Career
Dr Anand began his career as Lecturer in English at GGN Khalsa College, Ludhiana. Then he became the Principal at DAV College, Bathinda and served there for 10 years. He co-founded World Foundation for Peace and was National Vice-President of International Human Rights Observatory in 2013 .  In 2016, he was called by the World Union of Poets [Italy]  to serve as the President of the Jury of their 2016 awards.

He represented India at the Kibatek 39 Poetry Festival organized by the Pablo Neruda Literary Association, Taranto, Italy held in February 2016. He represented India at the World Institute of Peace Nigeria organized World Peace Seminar in Nov. 2016.

During his career, he served on the Boards of educational societies including the Senate and Syndicate of Punjabi University, and Board of Studies of Guru Kashi University. Anand has authored 140 books, published 120 articles, published various national and international anthologies, and has introduced poets by writing Review Articles and Forewords for their books.

Dr Anand has also been a leader in the fight against climate change. He led the country wide tree plantation campaign in Bathinda Punjab, in association with 27th Battalion of Indo Tibetan Border Police Force, under the initiative 'My Earth My Duty' following a directive from 'The Ministry of Youth Affairs and Sports, Government of India' and planted 21000 saplings in the region. Later he went on with this campaign and planted approx. 100,000 saplings at various places in the Punjab region. He coined and has always believed in his Punjabi Quote 'IKK RUKHKH SAU SUKHKH' (ਇੱਕ ਰੁੱਖ ਸੌ ਸੁੱਖ).

Selected bibliography

.

Major awards and recognition
Member of the Commission for the International Best Poet Award 2017 of the World Nations Writers Union, Kazakhstan
First Ambassador of the World Union of Poets, Italy.
Chairperson of World Foundation for Peace, and Writers International Foundation
Dr Anand  evolved the theory of BIOTEXT in Literary Theory
Cross for Peace for his Lifetime Achievement in the Field of Poetry and Peace by World Union of Poets.
2017: Art4peace award by Art4peace Foundation, Hollywood, USA
2017: World epitome of leadership award World Institute of Peace, Nigeria
2017: Honored with Lord of World Peace and Literature Award, conferred at India World Poetry Festival, held at Ramoji City, Hyderabad 13-14th Oct, 2017
Dr M S Randhawa Award for Promotion of Art & Culture of Punjab Conferred
2009: Recipient of Penguin Rising Personalities of India Award 
2008: Best Educationist Award for the outstanding achievements in academics by National and International Compendium in New Delhi
Avantika educational excellence award by Sri Rajiv Gandhi Foundation Ratia
Founder President, Philosophique Poetica [De-Anand] - A Portal for Poetry, Art, Peace and Philosophy

Membership and appointments
Member, Syndicate, Punjabi University, Patiala.
Fellow, Punjabi University, Patiala
Member, Board of Studies, Guru Kashi University, Talwandi Sabo
National Vice-president, International Human Rights Observatory [ihro]
Patron and Honorary Chief Editor: Symphony International 
Life Member: United Writers Association, Chennai	
Chairman of the International Society of Poets	
Chairman of the Sufi Arts Foundation	
Member of the Association of Indian College Principals	
Patron: Academic Earth Institute of Multi-studies

References

Poets from Punjab, India
1955 births
Living people